Vavrinec is a village and municipality Slovakia

Vavrinec or Vavřinec may also refer to:

 Vavrinec Dunajský, Slovak sculptor.
 Vavrinec Benedikt z Nedožier, Slovak mathematician, teacher, poet, translator and philologist
 Vaclav Vavrinec Reiner, German painter who lived and died in Prague, Bohemia
 Mirka Vavrinec, Swiss professional tennis player
 Svaty Vavrinec, a grape variety

 Vavřinec Hradilek, Czech slalom canoeist
 Vavřinec (Blansko District), Czech Republic
 Vavřinec (Kutná Hora District), Czech Republic